Paul Colman is a British-Australian pop-rock guitarist, vocalist, pianist, and composer. He has made a name for himself as a Christian musician independently, with his band the Paul Colman Trio, as a solo artist, and as part of the Newsboys. His songwriting abilities have been acknowledged with a Grammy nomination and Dove Awards.

Colman was born and brought up in London; his father is Australian and his mother is British. When he was seven years old, his father left his successful life of theatre and music for a life of ministry back in Australia. His father was a long-standing Associate Pastor at Melbourne's Crossway Baptist Church and a well known gospel singer. Colman thus began his musical career living in Melbourne, starting his first band when he was eleven years old. During the first part of his life Colman did not take music too seriously, and focused on his career as a high-school teacher of history, English, and religion.

He has made a name for himself as a Christian musician independently, with his band the Paul Colman Trio, as a solo artist, and with the Newsboys. His songwriting abilities have been acknowledged with a Grammy nomination and Dove Awards.

Career
In 1998, Colman began the Paul Colman Trio, or PC3, in Melbourne; it has been credited as being at the forefront of the Contemporary Christian music scene in Australia. The debut single, "Fill My Cup", ranked number three on TRAA, and attracted more than 1,000 people for each CD launch in Sydney, Melbourne, and Brisbane. Colman fans can be found around the globe due to his willingness to travel sharing his craft with listeners from Uganda to Holland to Perth and beyond.

Colman announced in early 2004 that he would return to his solo career. His debut solo album, Let It Go, gained much popularity in America and Australia. After a couple of years, he joined the Newsboys in 2005, replacing the main guitarist Bryan Olesen who went on to focus on his band Casting Pearls. The first Newsboys CD featuring Colman, titled GO, was released 31 October 2006.
	
On 5 January 2009 Colman announced that he was leaving the Newsboys to concentrate on his solo career. History, a collection of cover tunes and previous songs was released on 27 January 2009, along with two digital EPs containing new material and other cover songs of Christian artists. 

In January 2011 Colman returned to the studio with Grant Norsworthy and Phil Gaudion of PC3 to work on a new Trio album. The album Return was released in April 2011 to coincide with a reunion tour of Australia. 

As of Summer 2011, Colman continues to work on his solo album while also producing for new artists such as Lainey Wright, Glenridge and Epic Season.

As of late 2017, Colman is collaborating with German singer/guitarist Claas P. Jambor as part of a duo called The Mighty Misfits.

Discography

Solo
 Life Is Where You Are EP (1997)
 The Band Thing (1997)
 One Voice, One Guitar (1998)
 Official Bootleg (2000)
 One Voice One Guitar Vol 2 (2005)
 Let It Go (2005)
 History (2009)
 If I Was Jesus EP (2009)
 From the Saltland to the River (2012)
 Recalculating EP #1 (2015)
 Recalculating EP #2 (2016)
 Recalculating EP #3 (2016)
 Recalculating (2016)
 Most Requested (2016)

With Paul Colman Trio
 Live in America (Official Bootleg), 1999
 Serious Fun, 1999
 Turn, 2000
 pc3 – Live Acoustic, 2001
 pc3 – Live Electric, 2001
 pc3 – Live (USA version), 2001
 New Map of the World, 2002
 One, 2003
 Return, 2011

With Newsboys
 GO, 2006
 GO Remixed, 2007
 The Greatest Hits, 2007
 Houston We Are GO, 2008

References

External links 
 

1967 births
Living people
British people of Australian descent
British performers of Christian music
Inpop Records artists
Newsboys members
Paul Colman Trio members
Peter Furler Band members